The 1928–29 National Football League was the 3rd staging of the National Football League, a Gaelic football tournament for the Gaelic Athletic Association county teams of Ireland.

For the second year in a row, Kerry defeated Kildare in the final.

Format 
There were four divisions – Northern, Southern, Eastern and Western. Division winners played off for the NFL title.

Results

North-Eastern Division
Armagh, Monaghan, Louth, Down, Antrim, Cavan.

Southern Division

Results

Table

South-Eastern Division

Western Division
Mayo, Sligo, Roscommon and Galway competed.

Knockout stage

Semi-finals

Finals

References

External links
 Fixtures and Results

National Football League
National Football League
National Football League (Ireland) seasons